Scalford railway station was a railway station serving the village of Scalford, Leicestershire on the Great Northern and London and North Western Joint Railway. It opened in 1879 and closed to regular traffic in 1953. It was the junction for a branch line to Waltham on the Wolds which was built to exploit ironstone deposits in the area.

References

Disused railway stations in Leicestershire
Railway stations in Great Britain opened in 1879
Railway stations in Great Britain closed in 1953
Former Great Northern Railway stations
Former London and North Western Railway stations